Morgentaler is a family name (or surname) of Jewish families from Poland.

Origin 

The family name Morgentaler developed among Ashkenazi Jews in Europe.

Distribution 

Until World War II in Poland, mainly in Łódź. The Central Database of Shoah Victims' Names  enlists many Jewish Morgentaler victims of the Holocaust. Few Polish Morgentalers survived and emigrated. Today's spreading is relatively high in Canada and Serbia.

People 
 Dr. Henry Morgentaler (1923, Łódź), Canadian physician and abortion activist
 Morgentaler v. The Queen, 1976 Supreme Court of Canada decision
 R. v. Morgentaler (1988),  Supreme Court of Canada decision
 R. v. Morgentaler (1993), Supreme Court of Canada decision
 Goldie Morgentaler (born 1950), Yiddish author

References

See also
 Morgenthaler (name)

Jewish surnames
German-language surnames
Surnames of Polish origin
Yiddish-language surnames

de:Morgentaler
fr:Morgentaler (homonymie)
ru:Моргенталер